The 1997 Gael Linn Cup, the most important representative competition for elite level participants in the women's team field sport of camogie, was won by Munster, who defeated Leinster in the final, played at Russell Park.

Arrangements
Leinster defeated Ulster 3–14 to 3–13 in the semi-final at Russell Park. Lynn Dunlea scored 2–5 as Munster defeated Connacht 3–14 to 2–10.

Final
Leinster led by four points ten minutes from the end of the final against Munster at Russell Park. But Munster's come back brought the match to extra-time for the second successive year and their superior fitness enabled them to add 3–7 during the 20 minutes of extended play.

Gael Linn Trophy
Munster defeated Connacht 3–14 to 4–6 and Kildare's Miriam Malone scored the only goal of the game as Leinster defeated Ulster 1–8. Tipperary's Deirdre Hughes scored 3–1 as Munster defeated Leinster 3–11 to 2–10 in the final.

Final stages

|}

Junior Final

|}

References

External links
 Camogie Association

1997 in camogie
1997